Jokanović is a Serbian surname, a patronymic derived from given name Jokan. It may refer to:

 Predrag Jokanović (born 1968), Serbian football player
 Rajko Jokanović (born 1971), Serbian volleyball player
 Slaviša Jokanović (born 1968), Serbian footballer and coach of Sheffield United.

See also
 Jokanovića kuća, heritage site in Užice
 Joković, surname
 Jokanić, surname
 Jokić, surname

Serbian surnames